The 2000–01 NBA season was the Kings' 52nd season in the National Basketball Association, and 16th season in Sacramento. During the off-season, the Kings acquired shooting guard Doug Christie from the Toronto Raptors, and signed free agent Bobby Jackson. After two straight playoff seasons, the Kings enjoyed another successful season by winning 14 of their first 18 games, on their way to a 27–10 start as of January 20, and held a 31–15 record at the All-Star break. The Kings would make it into the NBA's elite status by challenging the Pacific Division all season, falling just one game short with a solid 55–27 record. The team also posted three five-game winning streaks, which was their longest winning streak during the season.

Chris Webber had his best season averaging 27.1 points, 11.1 rebounds, 4.2 assists and 1.7 blocks per game, while being named to the All-NBA First Team. In addition, Peja Stojaković showed improvement stepping into the lineup averaging 20.4 points per game, which was second on the team in scoring, while Christie averaged 12.3 points and 2.3 steals per game, Vlade Divac provided the team with 12.0 points and 8.3 rebounds per game, and Jason Williams contributed 9.4 points and 5.4 assists per game. Webber and Divac were both selected for the 2001 NBA All-Star Game, with head coach Rick Adelman coaching the Western Conference. Webber also finished in fourth place in Most Valuable Player voting with 5 first-place votes, while Stojaković finished in second place in Most Improved Player voting, Christie finished in fourth place in Defensive Player of the Year voting, and Jackson finished in fourth place in Sixth Man of the Year voting. Christie was also named to the NBA All-Defensive Second Team, and first round draft pick Hedo Türkoğlu made the NBA All-Rookie Second Team.

In the Western Conference First Round of the playoffs, the Kings faced the Phoenix Suns. After losing Game 1 to the Suns at home, 86–83, the Kings would win the next three games, and advance to the second round for the first time since moving to Sacramento. However, they were swept by the defending and eventual NBA champion Los Angeles Lakers in the Western Conference Semi-finals in four straight games. The Lakers would reach the NBA Finals to defeat the Philadelphia 76ers in five games, winning their second consecutive championship.

Following the season, the controversial guard Williams was traded along with Nick Anderson to the Memphis Grizzlies, while three-point specialist Jon Barry was traded to the Detroit Pistons, and Darrick Martin signed as a free agent with the Dallas Mavericks.

Offseason
In the NBA draft, the Kings drafted Hedo Türkoğlu and Jabari Smith. Türkoğlu's tenure with the Kings lasted three seasons, while Smith's stint lasted 21 games. Smith would return to Sacramento in the 2003–04 season.

During the offseason, the Kings did not make many transactions. On August 1, the Kings signed guard Bobby Jackson. Jackson would be a reliable bench player during his tenure in Sacramento, and he would win the Sixth Man of the Year Award for the 2002–03 season.

On September 30, the Kings traded combo forward Corliss Williamson to the Toronto Raptors for Doug Christie. Christie would be the starting shooting guard for the Kings for his entire tenure with the team.

On October 20, the Kings waived center Jerome James. James had missed all of the previous season due to a knee injury.

Draft picks

Roster

Regular season

Season standings

z – clinched division title
y – clinched division title
x – clinched playoff spot

Record vs. opponents

Game log

|-style="background:#cfc;"
| 1
| October 31
| @ Chicago
| 
| Webber, Stojaković (23)
| Webber, Stojaković (8)
| Chris Webber (7)
| United Center21,814
| 1–0

|-style="background:#fcc;"
| 2
| November 1
| @ Cleveland
| 
| Chris Webber (27)
| Chris Webber (8)
| Webber, Jackson, Barry (5)
| Gund Arena17,695
| 1–1
|-style="background:#cfc;"
| 3
| November 3
| @ Detroit
| 
| Chris Webber (31)
| Chris Webber (12)
| Jon Barry (7)
| The Palace of Auburn Hills22,076
| 2–1
|-style="background:#fcc;"
| 4
| November 4
| @ Minnesota
| 
| Peja Stojaković (22)
| Vlade Divac (12)
| Stojaković, Jackson, Webber, Christie (3)
| Target Center19,006
| 2–2
|-style="background:#cfc;"
| 5
| November 6
| Portland
| 
| Chris Webber (29)
| Vlade Divac (11)
| Webber, Jackson (6)
| ARCO Arena17,317
| 3–2
|-style="background:#cfc;"
| 6
| November 8
| Golden State
| 
| Webber, Stojaković (27)
| Chris Webber (9)
| Jason Williams (12)
| ARCO Arena17,317
| 4–2
|-style="background:#cfc;"
| 7
| November 10
| @ Golden State
| 
| Chris Webber (35)
| Chris Webber (16)
| Jason Williams (8)
| The Arena in Oakland17,467
| 5–2
|-style="background:#cfc;"
| 8
| November 12
| Dallas
| 
| Peja Stojaković (28)
| Chris Webber (13)
| Divac, Williams (7)
| ARCO Arena17,317
| 6–2
|-style="background:#cfc;"
| 9
| November 14
| Orlando
| 
| Peja Stojaković (27)
| Stojaković, Divac (11)
| Jason Williams (8)
| ARCO Arena17,317
| 7–2
|-style="background:#fcc;"
| 10
| November 16
| L.A. Lakers
| 
| Doug Christie (32)
| Peja Stojaković (17)
| Jason Williams (7)
| ARCO Arena17,317
| 7–3
|-style="background:#cfc;"
| 11
| November 22
| Chicago
| 
| Chris Webber (29)
| Chris Webber (13)
| Jason Williams (7)
| ARCO Arena17,317
| 8–3
|-style="background:#cfc;"
| 12
| November 25
| Seattle
| 
| Peja Stojaković (29)
| Chris Webber (14)
| Jason Williams (10)
| ARCO Arena17,317
| 9–3
|-style="background:#cfc;"
| 13
| November 28
| @ Houston
| 
| Chris Webber (21)
| Chris Webber (11)
| Webber, Divac (4)
| Compaq Center11,813
| 10–3
|-style="background:#fcc;"
| 14
| November 29
| @ San Antonio
| 
| Chris Webber (25)
| Chris Webber (17)
| Bobby Jackson (6)
| Alamodome17,341
| 10–4

|-style="background:#cfc;"
| 15
| December 1
| Phoenix
| 
| Chris Webber (28)
| Chris Webber (14)
| Doug Christie (6)
| ARCO Arena17,317
| 11–4
|-style="background:#cfc;"
| 16
| December 5
| San Antonio
| 
| Chris Webber (30)
| Webber, Stojaković (10)
| Jason Williams (7)
| ARCO Arena17,317
| 12–4
|-style="background:#cfc;"
| 17
| December 8
| Houston
| 
| Chris Webber (37)
| Chris Webber (18)
| Doug Christie (8)
| ARCO Arena17,317
| 13–4
|-style="background:#cfc;"
| 18
| December 10
| Miami
| 
| Chris Webber (19)
| Chris Webber (10)
| Christie, Barry (5)
| ARCO Arena17,317
| 14–4
|-style="background:#fcc;"
| 19
| December 12
| @ Atlanta
| 
| Chris Webber (22)
| Chris Webber (13)
| Doug Christie (6)
| Philips Arena18,113
| 14–5
|-style="background:#fcc;"
| 20
| December 13
| @ Charlotte
| 
| Chris Webber (25)
| Vlade Divac (8)
| Webber, Christie, Barry (4)
| Charlotte Coliseum12,806
| 14–6
|-style="background:#cfc;"
| 21
| December 15
| @ Boston
| 
| Chris Webber (30)
| Chris Webber (13)
| Jason Williams (7)
| FleetCenter15,486
| 15–6
|-style="background:#cfc;"
| 22
| December 17
| @ New Jersey
| 
| Chris Webber (33)
| Chris Webber (12)
| Jon Barry (6)
| Continental Airlines Arena13,011
| 16–6
|-style="background:#cfc;"
| 23
| December 19
| Washington
| 
| Chris Webber (19)
| Chris Webber (11)
| Jon Barry (6)
| ARCO Arena17,317
| 17–6
|-style="background:#fcc;"
| 24
| December 20
| @ Seattle
| 
| Chris Webber (20)
| Chris Webber (13)
| Webber, Williams (5)
| KeyArena17,072
| 17–7
|-style="background:#cfc;"
| 25
| December 22
| @ Vancouver
| 
| Chris Webber (33)
| Chris Webber (12)
| Vlade Divac (7)
| General Motors Place14,656
| 18–7
|-style="background:#cfc;"
| 26
| December 23
| Seattle
| 
| Chris Webber (23)
| Chris Webber (11)
| Vlade Divac (4)
| ARCO Arena17,317
| 19–7
|-style="background:#cfc;"
| 27
| December 28
| Charlotte
| 
| Chris Webber (24)
| Chris Webber (10)
| Webber, Divac, Williams, Jackson (4)
| ARCO Arena17,317
| 20–7
|-style="background:#fcc;"
| 28
| December 30
| Philadelphia
| 
| Peja Stojaković (33)
| Chris Webber (10)
| Jason Williams (5)
| ARCO Arena17,317
| 20–8

|-style="background:#cfc;"
| 29
| January 2
| Phoenix
| 
| Vlade Divac (34)
| Vlade Divac (12)
| Vlade Divac (6)
| ARCO Arena17,317
| 21–8
|-style="background:#fcc;"
| 30
| January 5
| Indiana
| 
| Chris Webber (51)
| Chris Webber (26)
| Jason Williams (6)
| ARCO Arena17,317
| 21–9
|-style="background:#cfc;"
| 31
| January 8
| Minnesota
| 
| Peja Stojaković (24)
| Webber, Stojaković (9)
| Jason Williams (7)
| ARCO Arena17,317
| 22–9
|-style="background:#cfc;"
| 32
| January 10
| Cleveland
| 
| Chris Webber (30)
| Chris Webber (14)
| Jason Williams (8)
| ARCO Arena17,317
| 23–9
|-style="background:#fcc;"
| 33
| January 12
| @ Denver
| 
| Chris Webber (24)
| Chris Webber (14)
| Jason Williams (8)
| Pepsi Center17,512
| 23–10
|-style="background:#cfc;"
| 34
| January 13
| @ Houston
| 
| Chris Webber (31)
| Chris Webber (14)
| Chris Webber (5)
| Compaq Center14,552
| 24–10
|-style="background:#cfc;"
| 35
| January 15
| @ Dallas
| 
| Chris Webber (34)
| Chris Webber (12)
| Doug Christie (6)
| Reunion Arena18,187
| 25–10
|-style="background:#cfc;"
| 36
| January 17
| Boston
| 
| Chris Webber (30)
| Vlade Divac (11)
| Jason Williams (8)
| ARCO Arena17,317
| 26–10
|-style="background:#cfc;"
| 37
| January 20
| @ Portland
| 
| Chris Webber (34)
| Chris Webber (10)
| Chris Webber (6)
| Rose Garden20,580
| 27–10
|-style="background:#fcc;"
| 38
| January 21
| @ Seattle
| 
| Peja Stojaković (30)
| Chris Webber (18)
| Divac, Barry (5)
| KeyArena17,072
| 27–11
|-style="background:#cfc;"
| 39
| January 23
| New Jersey
| 
| Chris Webber (25)
| Vlade Divac (10)
| Chris Webber (10)
| ARCO Arena17,317
| 28–11
|-style="background:#fcc;"
| 40
| January 25
| San Antonio
| 
| Stojaković, Webber (23)
| Chris Webber (11)
| Divac, Williams (4)
| ARCO Arena17,317
| 28–12
|-style="background:#cfc;"
| 41
| January 27
| @ L.A. Clippers
| 
| Chris Webber (33)
| Webber, Divac (11)
| Webber, Christie, Williams (5)
| Staples Center19,341
| 29–12
|-style="background:#cfc;"
| 42
| January 30
| Golden State
| 
| Chris Webber (28)
| Chris Webber (12)
| Jason Williams (9)
| ARCO Arena17,317
| 30–12

|-style="background:#cfc;"
| 43
| February 2
| Vancouver
| 
| Chris Webber (41)
| Chris Webber (15)
| Jason Williams (6)
| ARCO Arena17,317
| 31–12
|-style="background:#fcc;"
| 44
| February 4
| @ L.A. Lakers
| 
| Chris Webber (25)
| Doug Christie (11)
| Chris Webber (9)
| Staples Center18,997
| 31–13
|-style="background:#fcc;"
| 45
| February 6
| @ Milwaukee
| 
| Chris Webber (39)
| Chris Webber (11)
| Chris Webber (8)
| Bradley Center17,329
| 31–14
|-style="background:#fcc;"
| 46
| February 7
| @ Minnesota
| 
| Chris Webber (22)
| Webber, Türkoğlu, Anderson (5)
| Nick Anderson (5)
| Target Center18,274
| 31–15
|-style="background:#cfc;"
| 47
| February 13
| @ Utah
| 
| Chris Webber (34)
| Webber, Stojaković, Pollard (8)
| Doug Christie (4)
| Delta Center19,485
| 32–15
|-style="background:#fcc;"
| 48
| February 15
| @ Portland
| 
| Vlade Divac (19)
| Vlade Divac (8)
| Jason Williams (4)
| Rose Garden20,471
| 32–16
|-style="background:#cfc;"
| 49
| February 16
| Denver
| 
| Peja Stojaković (29)
| Scot Pollard (11)
| Doug Christie (8)
| ARCO Arena17,317
| 33–16
|-style="background:#fcc;"
| 50
| February 18
| Utah
| 
| Peja Stojaković (27)
| Doug Christie (9)
| Jason Williams (6)
| ARCO Arena17,317
| 33–17
|-style="background:#cfc;"
| 51
| February 20
| Atlanta
| 
| Jason Williams (22)
| Vlade Divac (19)
| Jason Williams (7)
| ARCO Arena17,317
| 34–17
|-style="background:#cfc;"
| 52
| February 22
| @ Washington
| 
| Doug Christie (32)
| Scot Pollard (14)
| Jason Williams (9)
| MCI Center19,911
| 35–17
|-style="background:#cfc;"
| 53
| February 23
| @ Toronto
| 
| Peja Stojaković (39)
| Scot Pollard (17)
| Jason Williams (6)
| Air Canada Centre19,800
| 36–17
|-style="background:#fcc;"
| 54
| February 25
| @ New York
| 
| Peja Stojaković (26)
| Scot Pollard (13)
| Peja Stojaković (7)
| Madison Square Garden19,763
| 36–18
|-style="background:#cfc;"
| 55
| February 27
| L.A. Clippers
| 
| Peja Stojaković (25)
| Vlade Divac (12)
| Jason Williams (6)
| ARCO Arena17,317
| 37–18
|-style="background:#cfc;"
| 56
| February 28
| @ Golden State
| 
| Peja Stojaković (24)
| Scot Pollard (10)
| Jason Williams (10)
| The Arena in Oakland19,107
| 38–18

|-style="background:#fcc;"
| 57
| March 2
| @ L.A. Clippers
| 
| Peja Stojaković (31)
| Scot Pollard (18)
| Vlade Divac (5)
| Staples Center19,415
| 38–19
|-style="background:#cfc;"
| 58
| March 6
| Toronto
| 
| Christie, Webber, Williams (19)
| Vlade Divac (17)
| Jason Williams (6)
| ARCO Arena17,317
| 39–19
|-style="background:#cfc;"
| 59
| March 7
| @ Phoenix
| 
| Chris Webber (41)
| Chris Webber (14)
| Bobby Jackson (6)
| America West Arena19,023
| 40–19
|-style="background:#cfc;"
| 60
| March 9
| Denver
| 
| Chris Webber (41)
| Chris Webber (12)
| Divac, Williams (6)
| ARCO Arena17,317
| 41–19
|-style="background:#cfc;"
| 61
| March 11
| Utah
| 
| Peja Stojaković (31)
| Webber, Stojaković, Divac (6)
| Chris Webber (8)
| ARCO Arena17,317
| 42–19
|-style="background:#cfc;"
| 62
| March 13
| @ Orlando
| 
| Chris Webber (33)
| Chris Webber (15)
| Chris Webber (7)
| TD Waterhouse Centre16,157
| 43–19
|-style="background:#fcc;"
| 63
| March 14
| @ Miami
| 
| Chris Webber (26)
| Chris Webber (17)
| Jason Williams (9)
| American Airlines Arena19,600
| 43–20
|-style="background:#cfc;"
| 64
| March 16
| @ Philadelphia
| 
| Chris Webber (26)
| Chris Webber (11)
| Peja Stojaković (7)
| First Union Center20,866
| 44–20
|-style="background:#fcc;"
| 65
| March 18
| @ Indiana
| 
| Peja Stojaković (27)
| Chris Webber (15)
| Jason Williams (5)
| Conseco Fieldhouse18,345
| 44–21
|-style="background:#cfc;"
| 66
| March 20
| Houston
| 
| Peja Stojaković (29)
| Chris Webber (10)
| Chris Webber (12)
| ARCO Arena17,317
| 45–21
|-style="background:#cfc;"
| 67
| March 22
| Detroit
| 
| Chris Webber (29)
| Chris Webber (15)
| Chris Webber (7)
| ARCO Arena17,317
| 46–21
|-style="background:#fcc;"
| 68
| March 25
| L.A. Lakers
| 
| Webber, Christie (15)
| Vlade Divac (14)
| Chris Webber (4)
| ARCO Arena17,317
| 46–22
|-style="background:#cfc;"
| 69
| March 27
| New York
| 
| Chris Webber (39)
| Chris Webber (15)
| Jason Williams (8)
| ARCO Arena17,317
| 47–22
|-style="background:#cfc;"
| 70
| March 28
| @ L.A. Lakers
| 
| Chris Webber (25)
| Chris Webber (12)
| Jason Williams (6)
| Staples Center18,997
| 48–22
|-style="background:#cfc;"
| 71
| March 30
| Minnesota
| 
| Chris Webber (22)
| Scot Pollard (13)
| Chris Webber (5)
| ARCO Arena17,317
| 49–22

|-style="background:#fcc;"
| 72
| April 1
| Dallas
| 
| Chris Webber (27)
| Webber, Christie (10)
| Doug Christie (6)
| ARCO Arena17,317
| 49–23
|-style="background:#fcc;"
| 73
| April 3
| Milwaukee
| 
| Chris Webber (28)
| Christie, Webber (11)
| Jason Williams (9)
| ARCO Arena17,317
| 49–24
|-style="background:#cfc;"
| 74
| April 5
| @ Utah
| 
| Chris Webber (26)
| Vlade Divac (12)
| Jason Williams (7)
| Delta Center19,911
| 50–24
|-style="background:#cfc;"
| 75
| April 6
| @ Vancouver
| 
| Chris Webber (36)
| Vlade Divac (12)
| Jason Williams (8)
| General Motors Place14,863
| 51–24
|-style="background:#cfc;"
| 76
| April 8
| Portland
| 
| Webber, Stojaković (20)
| Vlade Divac (17)
| Chris Webber (5)
| ARCO Arena17,317
| 52–24
|-style="background:#cfc;"
| 77
| April 10
| L.A. Clippers
| 
| Chris Webber (31)
| Chris Weber (11)
| Doug Christie (6)
| ARCO Arena17,317
| 53–24
|-style="background:#cfc;"
| 78
| April 12
| @ San Antonio
| 
| Chris Webber (26)
| Divac, Webber (13)
| Jason Williams (9)
| Alamodome34,357
| 54–24
|-style="background:#fcc;"
| 79
| April 13
| @ Dallas
| 
| Chris Webber (24)
| Chris Webber (13)
| Divac, Williams (4)
| Reunion Arena18,187
| 54–25
|-style="background:#fcc;"
| 80
| April 15
| @ Phoenix
| 
| Chris Webber (22)
| Peja Stojaković (12)
| Jason Williams (5)
| America West Arena19,023
| 54–26
|-style="background:#cfc;"
| 81
| April 16
| Vancouver
| 
| Peja Stojaković (31)
| Vlade Divac (16)
| Stojaković, Christie, Divac, Williams (5)
| ARCO Arena17,317
| 55–26
|-style="background:#fcc;"
| 82
| April 18
| @ Denver
| 
| Scot Pollard (18)
| Scot Pollard (14)
| Jon Barry (7)
| Pepsi Center18,495
| 55–27

Playoffs

|- align="center" bgcolor="#ffcccc"
| 1
| April 22
| Phoenix
| L 83–86
| Chris Webber (27)
| Chris Webber (15)
| Christie, Williams (5)
| ARCO Arena17,317
| 0–1
|- align="center" bgcolor="#ccffcc"
| 2
| April 25
| Phoenix
| W 116–90
| Peja Stojaković (22)
| Jackson, Webber (9)
| Chris Webber (5)
| ARCO Arena17,317
| 1–1
|- align="center" bgcolor="#ccffcc"
| 3
| April 29
| @ Phoenix
| W 104–96
| Chris Webber (23)
| Vlade Divac (12)
| Doug Christie (4)
| America West Arena19,023
| 2–1
|- align="center" bgcolor="#ccffcc"
| 4
| May 2
| @ Phoenix
| W 89–82
| Peja Stojaković (37)
| Scot Pollard (13)
| Bobby Jackson (5)
| America West Arena18,836
| 3–1
|-

|- align="center" bgcolor="#ffcccc"
| 1
| May 6
| @ L.A. Lakers
| L 105–108
| Chris Webber (34)
| Scot Pollard (14)
| Jason Williams (4)
| Staples Center18,997
| 0–1
|- align="center" bgcolor="#ffcccc"
| 2
| May 8
| @ L.A. Lakers
| L 90–96
| Chris Webber (22)
| Chris Webber (18)
| Bobby Jackson (4)
| Staples Center18,997
| 0–2
|- align="center" bgcolor="#ffcccc"
| 3
| May 11
| L.A. Lakers
| L 81–103
| Chris Webber (28)
| Chris Webber (14)
| Doug Christie (5)
| ARCO Arena17,317
| 0–3
|- align="center" bgcolor="#ffcccc"
| 4
| May 13
| L.A. Lakers
| L 113–119
| Peja Stojaković (26)
| Chris Webber (11)
| Chris Webber (8)
| ARCO Arena17,317
| 0–4
|-

Player statistics

Regular season

Playoffs

Awards and records
 Doug Christie, NBA All-Defensive Second Team
 Vlade Divac, 2001 NBA All-Star Game
 Hedo Türkoğlu, NBA All-Rookie Second Team
 Chris Webber, 2001 NBA All-Star Game
 Chris Webber, Player of the Week (Dec. 10)
 Chris Webber, Player of the Week (Jan. 21)
 Chris Webber, All-NBA First Team
 Geoff Petrie, NBA Executive of the Year
 Rick Adelman, Western Conference All-Stars Head Coach

Transactions

Trades

Free agents

Additions

Subtractions

Player Transactions Citation:

References

See also
 2000–01 NBA season

Sacramento Kings seasons
Sacramento
Sacramento
Sacramento